Eumemmerring Province was an electorate of the Victorian Legislative Council. It existed as a two-member electorate from 1985 to 2006, with members holding alternating eight-year terms. It was a marginal seat throughout its existence, changing parties in the large landslide elections of 1992 and 2002. It was abolished from the 2006 state election in the wake of the Bracks Labor government's reform of the Legislative Council.

It was located on the south-eastern fringe of Melbourne. In 2002, when it was last contested, it covered an area of 2,199 km2 and included the suburbs of Berwick, Cockatoo, Dandenong, Emerald, Gembrook, Narre Warren, Warburton and Yarra Junction.

Members for Eumemmerring Province

Election results

Former electoral provinces of Victoria (Australia)
1985 establishments in Australia
2006 disestablishments in Australia